Amanda Andrea Renteria (born November 15, 1974) is an American former body woman and CEO of the nonprofit organization Code for America. She previously worked as a political aide in the roles of National Political Director for Hillary Clinton during Clinton's 2016 presidential run, chief of operations for California Attorney General Xavier Becerra, and chief of staff and legislative advisor to United States Senators Dianne Feinstein and Debbie Stabenow. A member of the Democratic Party, Renteria is the first Latina Chief of Staff in the history of the United States Senate.

Renteria has twice run for public office. She was the Democratic nominee for the United States House of Representatives for  California's 21st congressional district in 2014, but lost to incumbent Republican David Valadao. In 2018 she ran for governor of California, but did not advance to the general election.

Personal life and education 
Renteria's father emigrated from Mexico in the 1960s, settling in Woodlake, California; her mother was born in the United States. The second of three daughters, Renteria double-majored in economics and political science at Stanford University, writing her senior honors thesis on women in politics. She played basketball and softball for the Stanford Cardinal. She also earned an MBA from Harvard Business School. Renteria lives in California, with her husband Patrick Brannelly, a managing director for a non-profit focused on brain-related diseases, and two children.

Career 
After college, Renteria became a financial analyst for Goldman Sachs. She decided to move to the public sector to "make a difference," working for one year as a math teacher at her former high school in Woodlake and helping San Jose with a neighborhood revitalization initiative, before going to Harvard Business School.

Renteria became a member of Senator Dianne Feinstein's staff in 2005. She later took a job with Senator and Senate Agriculture Committee Chairwoman Debbie Stabenow as a legislative aid on economic issues. She was promoted to legislative director, and became Stabenow's chief of staff in 2008. Renteria was the first Latina chief of staff in Senate history.

In 2013, Renteria was considered for the role of chairman of the Commodity Futures Trading Commission, but withdrew her name from consideration. According to Reuters, “Washington policy-watchers widely assumed that Renteria would get the job, but last-minute questions about her perceived lack of experience got in the way.” Politico noted that “financial reform advocates reacted with shock to reports that the White House was considering her for the position.”

In August 2013, Renteria moved back to California, where she briefly worked as a substitute teacher before announcing her congressional candidacy.

2014 congressional candidacy 
Renteria ran for Congress in California's 21st congressional district. On announcing her candidacy, she stated, "I'm running because I grew up here, and I believe the Valley needs a strong voice in Washington. We have to have folks who know how to work across the aisle, and who know how to be effective." Republican David Valadao holds the seat. In the June 3 primary, Renteria received 11,682 votes and about 25.6% overall, ahead of fellow Democrat John Hernandez, but fell nearly 40% behind Valadao, thus becoming the Democratic nominee. At the time of the primary, Cook Political Report considered the seat to be “likely Republican.”

On July 20, 2014, both Maryland Governor Martin O'Malley and representative Nancy Pelosi held a fundraiser to support Renteria's candidacy. President Barack Obama also appeared at a fundraiser with Renteria, calling her one of “two outstanding candidates and part of what it is that we’re just trying to build here and across the country." According to the Fresno Bee, the Democratic Congressional Campaign Committee reserved $1 million for ads in September in her district. On October 7 Vice President Joe Biden spoke at a fundraiser for Renteria.

On the Affordable Care Act, The Hill reported Renteria as saying that “something needed to be done at the time and that she opposes repealing the law now.”

In October 2014, Roll Call reported that the Democratic Congressional Campaign Committee announced plans to cut campaign ads in the final two weeks of the campaign, "a signal the party does not see a path to victory for these candidates or races."

In the November 4 general election, Renteria lost to Valadao by an almost 58% to 42% margin.

2016 Clinton campaign 
Leaked emails of John Podesta show that the Hillary Clinton campaign was looking for a "Hispanic woman" for the position of political director of her 2016 presidential campaign. Following her loss to David Valadao, Renteria was hired to fill that position.

Hillary Clinton email investigation 
In early March 2016, hackers working with Dutch intelligence had reportedly provided a highly classified Russian government document to the FBI. The document, which had "possible translation issues," had purportedly contained a memorialization of an alleged conversation between Renteria and then-Attorney General Loretta Lynch. One of the allegations within the document said that Renteria had been assured that "Lynch would keep the Clinton investigation from going too far." Although the FBI determined that the document was not credible, then-FBI Director James Comey said it was "one of the bricks in the load" that led to his decision to not consult with the Department of Justice before closing the investigation.

2018 gubernatorial campaign
On February 20, 2018, Renteria announced her candidacy in the 2018 California gubernatorial election. Renteria finished seventh out of 27 candidates on the ballot in California's unique "top-two primary"; she received 86,287 votes, for 1.3% of the vote. Renteria finished behind Democratic candidates Lieutenant Governor Gavin Newsom (who advanced to the runoff with 33.5% of the vote), former Los Angeles Mayor Antonio Villaraigosa (13.2%), State Treasurer John Chiang (9.5%) and former Superintendent of Public Instruction Delaine Eastin (3.3%). She also finished behind Republicans John H. Cox (who advanced to the runoff against Newsom with 25.7% of the vote) and State Assemblyman Travis Allen (9.5%).

Code for America 
In May 2020 Renteria was appointed CEO of the nonprofit organization Code for America.

Electoral history

California's 21st congressional district, 2014

California gubernatorial election, 2018

References

External links 
 

1974 births
Living people
American people of Mexican descent
California Democrats
Candidates in the 2018 United States elections
Harvard Business School alumni
Hillary Clinton
People from Sanger, California
People from Woodlake, California
Political campaign staff
Political chiefs of staff
Stanford Cardinal softball players
Stanford University alumni
United States congressional aides
Softball players from California
Basketball players from California
Stanford Cardinal women's basketball players